DUSD may refer to:

School districts

California
 Dublin Unified School District
 Dysart Unified School District
 Downey Unified School District
 Duarte Unified School District
 Dixon Unified School District
 Delhi Unified School District
 Denair Unified School District